Ringette Canada is the national governing body for the sport of ringette in Canada. It was established in 1974 with June Tiessen as its first President and has its current headquarters in Ottawa, Ontario. It is responsible for the organization and promotion of ringette on a nationwide basis and organizes Canada's semi-professional ringette league, the National Ringette League (NRL) which was established in 2004, with the league functioning as a committee under Ringette Canada. In 1986, Ringette Canada became a member of the International Ringette Federation which at the time was known as the "World Ringette Council". Its national hall of fame, the Ringette Canada Hall of Fame, was established in 1988. The first time a Canadian ringette team traveled overseas to Europe (Finland) was in 1979.

With the help of Ringette Canada, the sport of ringette was first introduced as part of the Canada Winter Games program in 1991, when the games took place in Prince Edward Island. The sport has been a prominent part of this multi-sport national event ever since. 

Ringette Canada is also responsible for scouting ringette talent in Canada in order to create the Canadian national ringette teams for both Team Canada Senior and Team Canada Junior who then compete at the World Ringette Championships. National team players are selected from the National Ringette League.

History

Formation

While Ringette Canada was formed in 1974, ringette began in Canada as an established sport in 1963 due to the efforts of its two founders, Sam Jacks and Red McCarthy, and two primary organizations in Ontario, the Society of Directors of Municipal Recreation of Ontario (SDMRO), and the Northern Ontario Recreation Directors Association (NORDA) in particular.

In 1983, Ringette Canada acquired the copyright to the official Ringette rules and Ringette rulebook from the Ontario Ringette Association (now known as Ringette Ontario) which had the copyright transferred to it from the SDMRO in 1973.

Despite its importance to the Canadian sporting community, Ringette Canada initially received little financial support and no funding from the federal government. In order to hold their meetings, the Toronto Pearson International Airport generously donated a basement room which was used as a gathering space for the organization.

Ringette Canada Presidents

June Tiessen from Waterloo, Ontario, became the first President of Ringette Canada in 1974.

Sam Jacks Trophy
The original Sam Jacks Trophy for the World Ringette Championships was first awarded at the inaugural 1990 World Ringette Championships but was replaced with a new design at the 1996 World Ringette Championships. The original trophy is now kept in the Ringette Canada office.

Jeanne Sauvé Memorial Cup

The Jeanne Sauvé Memorial Cup was established by Ringette Canada President, Betty Shields in December 1984 and named after Jeanne Sauvé, Canada's first female Governor General. Originally called the "Jeanne Sauvé Cup", it was first presented at the 1985 Canadian Ringette Championships in Dollard-des-Ormeaux, Québec. It has since been renamed the, "Jeanne Sauvé Memorial Cup".

Cyber attack
Non-profit, grassroots organizations in sport became increasingly vulnerable to cyberattacks after the creation of the internet. In 2019, Ringette Canada became the target of a ransomware attack.

Development

Provincial and Territorial associations
Beginning in 1969 with the Ontario Ringette Association (now called Ringette Ontario), provincial ringette associations continued to develop across Canada. See the table below for development.

National championships

The Canadian Ringette Championships (French: Championnats Canadien d'Ringuette) which is abbreviated CRC in english, is the annual premiere national ringette tournament for the best ringette players and teams in Canada and consists of three groups: the Under-16 (U16), the Under-19 (U19), and the elite ringette players in the National Ringette League (NRL) for which the CRC's serve as the league's seasonal championship. The first tournament was held in Winnipeg, Manitoba in 1979.

Semi-professional league

Canada's semi-professional ringette league is the National Ringette League (NRL) which was established in 2004. All of Canada's national ringette team players compete in the NRL.

National teams

The Canadian national ringette team includes two separate teams: Team Canada Senior and Team Canada Junior, with both teams now competing at the World Ringette Championships. Canada has competed in all of the World Ringette Championships since the sport's inaugural world competition in 1990, but it has only been since the 2013 World Ringette Championships that both national teams have competed in the World Ringette Championships together since both age divisions initially held their world championship tournaments separately.

Senior national team

Canada's first appearance in international competition for the sport of ringette took place at the inaugural World Ringette Championships in 1990. At the time, the country sent six separate regional teams as its national representative: Team Alberta (Calgary Debs), Team Ontario, Team Quebec, Team Saskatchewan, and Team Manitoba. Another team, Team Gloucester, also competed since the first tournament was hosted in Gloucester, Ontario. It wasn't until the 1996 World Ringette Championships that Canada officially finally sent its first, single and exclusive national ringette team.

Junior national team

Until the 2009 World Junior Ringette Championships, Canada only had national representation at the adult level (now known as Team Canada Senior) since the World Ringette Championships were specifically reserved for elite women athletes. Canada didn't have any Team Canada Junior representation of any kind until the inaugural 2009 World Junior Ringette Championships, but at that time sent two separate regional teams: U19 Canada East (Under-29) and U19 Canada West (Under-19). Team Canada Junior has periodically alternated between the age groups of U19 and U21 since 2009.

Until the 2013 World Ringette Championships, the junior tournament was held as a separate event. Junior national teams competed at the World Junior Ringette Championships in 2009 and 2012, while the senior national teams competed at the World Ringette Championships. In 2013 the senior and junior tournaments merged into a single one, the World Ringette Championships, where Canada's first single and exclusive national junior ringette team made its world debut. Team Canada Junior has competed in every world junior event.

University and college ringette

Ringette is played at a number of Canadian universities and colleges who abide by rules and regulations organized by Ringette Canada. An national tournament called the, "University Challenge Cup" is played annually.

See also
Ringette
Ringette in Canada
Ringette Finland
Sweden Ringette Association
International Ringette Federation
Sam Jacks
Red McCarthy

Further reading
 Collins, Kenneth Stewart (2004). The Ring Starts Here: An Illustrated History of Ringette. 
 Hall, Margaret Ann (2016). The Girl and the Game: A History of Women's Sport in Canada. University of Toronto Press.
 Hall, Margaret Ann; Pfister, Gertrud. Honoring the Legacy: Fifty Years of the International Association of Physical Education and Sport for Girls and Women.

References

External links 
  Ringette Canada
  Archives | Ringette Manitoba | Archives
  Ringette Calgary History

Women's sports governing bodies in Canada
Sports governing bodies in Canada
Ringette
Women's team sports
History of women's sports
Semi-professional sports
Semi-professional sports leagues